The following is a list of Kent State Golden Flashes men's basketball head coaches. There have been 24 head coaches of the Golden Flashes in their 107-season history.

Kent State's current head coach is Rob Senderoff. He was hired as the Golden Flashes' head coach in April 2011, replacing Geno Ford, who left to become the head coach at Bradley.

References

Kent State

Kent State Golden Flashes basketball, men's, coaches